Larbi Hosni (born February 11, 1981 in Algiers) is an Algerian footballer. He currently plays as a defender for CA Bordj Bou Arréridj in the Algerian Ligue Professionnelle 2.

International career
Hosni received his first cap for Algeria in a 2-1 friendly win against Libya on February 7, 2007. Since then, he made 2 more appearances for the team, first as a substitute in a friendly against Argentina (3-4), then as a starter in another friendly against Brazil (0-2).

Honours
 Won the Algerian Cup once with MC Alger in 2007
 Won the Algerian Super Cup twice with MC Alger in 2006 and 2007
 Has 3 caps for the Algerian National Team

References

External links
 

1981 births
Algerian footballers
Algeria international footballers
Living people
Footballers from Algiers
USM Alger players
MC Alger players
ASO Chlef players
RC Kouba players
CA Bordj Bou Arréridj players
Algerian Ligue 2 players
Association football defenders
21st-century Algerian people